Boninosuccinea ogasawarae is a species of air-breathing land snail, a terrestrial gastropod mollusc in the family Succineidae, the amber snails.

Distribution
This species of amber snail is endemic to Japan.

References

Succineidae
Molluscs of Japan
Taxonomy articles created by Polbot